Ottavio Pratesi (1 January 1889 – 3 November 1977) was an Italian racing cyclist. He rode in the 1923 Tour de France.

References

External links
 

1889 births
1977 deaths
Italian male cyclists
Place of birth missing
Sportspeople from the Province of Livorno
Cyclists from Tuscany